Mbye is a surname of Gambian origin. Notable people with the surname include:

Mohammed Mbye, (born 1989), Swedish-Gambian football player
Moses Mbye (born 1993), Australian Rugby League player of Gambian descent

See also
Mbaye

Gambian surnames